Magic Car are a British Americana / folk rock band formed in 1994 by the actor Phil Smeeton (songwriter and guitarist) and Hazel Atkinson (vocalist). They signed to the independent record label Tiny Dog Records in 1999 and have released four albums - Yellow Main Sequence (2001), Family Matters (2005), and European Punks (2002), a joint album with Scott 4. A fourth, Meteorites was released in 2016.

Members
Phil Smeeton - songwriter and guitarist. Also an actor with roles in Judge Dredd (film) and Sharpe's Revenge
Hazel Atkinson - vocalist
Martyn West – lead guitarist
Doug Ebling – drums
John Thompson – bass. Has also played with Scott 4, Flipron and The Selecter

Discography

Albums
2001: Yellow Main Sequence 
2002: European Punks - jointly with Scott 4
2005: Family Matters
2016: Meteorites

References

External links
 Tinydog.co.uk Official Magic car page

English folk rock groups
Americana music groups